Caroline Tillette (born 16 July 1988 in Paris) is a French-Swiss actress.

She attended classes at Cours Florent. After several short films, she made an appearance in Plus belle la vie in 2008 playing Pauline, the daughter of a mafia Don. In 2009, she joined LAMDA (the London Academy of Music and Drama) and had a role in Gainsbourg, vie héroïque directed by Joann Sfar. In 2011 she played Albertine Simonet in the television movie À la recherche du temps perdu directed by Nina Companeez.

Filmography
 Projet ODIN by Cedric Peyster
 Carole by Maxime Foulon
 Le Café by Jean-Mathieu Gennisson
 Mon Dieu à moi by Mousavi
 2008 : Plus belle la vie (TV): Pauline
 2009 : Gainsbourg, vie héroïque directed by Joann Sfar
 2011 : À la recherche du temps perdu directed by Nina Companeez: Albertine Simonet
 2011 : Bienvenue à bord directed by Eric Lavaine: Sonia's secretary Jerome Berthelot
 2012 : Populaire directed by Régis Roinsard: The vamp
 2012 : Interview with a Hitman directed by Perry Bhandal: Bethesda

References

External links

1988 births
Actresses from Paris
Alumni of the London Academy of Music and Dramatic Art
Living people
Cours Florent alumni
French film actresses
French television actresses
21st-century French actresses